The Cosworth-Opel KF engine is a production-based, high-revving, prototype, four-stroke, 2.5-liter, naturally aspirated, V-6 racing engine, originally designed, developed and produced by Opel, in collaboration with Cosworth, for the DTM and later ITC, between 1993 and 1996. The engines were tuned by Cosworth, and were based on both the General Motors C25XE (1993–1995) and the Isuzu 6VD1 (1996) production engines, as used in the Trooper, Rodeo, and Amigo.

Applications
Opel Calibra V6 4x4

References

Opel
V6 engines
Opel engines
Cosworth
Gasoline engines by model
Engines by model
Piston engines
Internal combustion engine